Cool Spring Presbyterian Church is a historic Presbyterian church building located near Lewes, Sussex County, Delaware. It was built in 1854, and is on the site of two previous church buildings that served the congregation dating back to its establishment in 1726. It is a one-story, frame structure, three bays deep, in a rural Greek Revival style.  It sits on a brick foundation and has a gable roof.  It features a simple pedimented portico supported by two Doric order columns.  The churchyard was officially granted to the congregation in 1737 by Governor Thomas Penn.

It was added to the National Register of Historic Places in 1976.

Gallery

References

External links
Cool Spring Presbyterian Church website

Presbyterian churches in Delaware
Churches on the National Register of Historic Places in Delaware
Churches completed in 1854
19th-century Presbyterian church buildings in the United States
Churches in Sussex County, Delaware
Buildings and structures in Lewes, Delaware
1726 establishments in Delaware
National Register of Historic Places in Sussex County, Delaware